Cyrtodactylus bidoupimontis is a gecko from Binh Phuoc and Lam Dong provinces, southern Vietnam.

Description
This species is distinguished from other species of the C. irregularis complex by its absence of enlarged, conical tubercles on its dorsal tail-base; the presence of flat and rounded dorsal tubercles; the pale dorsal head surface pattern lacks dark brown irregular spots with light edges; and it possesses elongated limbs.

References

Further reading
Nguyen, Sang Ngoc, et al. "Phylogeny of the Cyrtodactylus irregularis species complex (Squamata: Gekkonidae) from Vietnam with the description of two new species." Zootaxa 3737.4 (2013): 399–414.
Nguyen, Sang Ngoc, et al. "DNA barcoding of Vietnamese bent-toed geckos (Squamata: Gekkonidae: Cyrtodactylus) and the description of a new species."Zootaxa 3784.1 (2014): 48–66.

External links
Reptile Database

Cyrtodactylus
Endemic fauna of Vietnam
Reptiles of Vietnam
Reptiles described in 2012